Hugh, Hugues, or Hugo of Chalon may refer to:

 Hugh of Chalon (bishop of Auxerre) (c. 975–1039), French religious leader
 Hugh III, Count of Burgundy (1220–1266), called Hugh of Chalon
 Hugh of Chalon (archbishop of Besançon) (died 1312), French religious leader
 Hugh I of Chalon-Arlay (1288–1322), French nobleman